Nitor medioximus is a species of small air-breathing land snail and terrestrial pulmonate gastropod mollusk in the family Helicarionidae. This species is endemic to Australia and grows to about 12 mm in diameter.

References

Further reading
 https://biodiversity.org.au/afd/taxa/Nitor_medioximus
 PDF of Malacologia article on forest snail faunas of NE New South Wales and SE Queensland, mentioning this species
 Government biodiversity summary for New South Wales, Northern Rivers region lists this species

Helicarionidae
Gastropods described in 1941